Stephen Karari Larkin (born July 24, 1973)  is an American former professional first baseman. He played in one Major League Baseball MLB game during his career, for the Cincinnati Reds against the Pittsburgh Pirates, batting 1-for-3. He spent most of his baseball career in the minor leagues.

Playing career
Larkin attended the University of Texas at Austin, and played college baseball for the Texas Longhorns. He played in the College World Series in 1992 and 1993.

He also played thirteen games for the Winston-Salem Warthogs that same year. 

In , he played for the Single-A Charleston AlleyCats for half a season and again for the Winston-Salem Warthogs and stayed on with the latter for the  season, as well. In , he was called up from the minors, then playing for the Chattanooga Lookouts, for his game with the Cincinnati Reds. Stephen Larkin played first base, his brother Barry played shortstop, while fellow Reds Bret Boone played second base and his younger brother Aaron Boone played third base making the occasion the only time in baseball history that two sets of siblings were on the field at the same time. 

Stephen Larkin's hit was a single hit on the ground, which passed between the opponent's first and second basemen during the bottom of the sixth inning of a home game against the Pittsburgh Pirates during the Reds' last game of the season, when the Reds were already eliminated from further contention for that year. The Reds won this game, 4 to 1. He finished his career by playing in the independent professional leagues from 2001 through 2005.

Personal life
He is the brother of Barry Larkin, who is a member of the Baseball Hall of Fame. Another brother, Byron Larkin, was an All-American basketball player at Xavier University. They were all raised Catholic. 

He attended Archbishop Moeller High School, graduating in 1991.

References

External links

Cincinnati Reds players
1973 births
Living people
Major League Baseball first basemen
Hudson Valley Renegades players
Charleston RiverDogs players
Chattanooga Lookouts players
Texas Longhorns baseball players
Bridgeport Bluefish players
Nashua Pride players
Newark Bears players
Northeast League Aces players
Allentown Ambassadors players
Parma Baseball Club players
Baseball players from Cincinnati
African-American Catholics
American expatriate baseball players in Italy
Charleston AlleyCats players
Winston-Salem Warthogs players